The Netsuite Open 2012 is the 2012's Netsuite Open, which is a tournament of the PSA World Tour event International (Prize money : 70 000 $). The event took place at the Standford Squash in San Francisco in the United States from 19 October to 23 October. Grégory Gaultier won his first Netsuite Open trophy, beating Nick Matthew in the final.

Prize money and ranking points
For 2012, the prize purse was $70,000. The prize money and points breakdown is as follows:

Seeds

Draw and results

See also
PSA World Tour 2012
Netsuite Open

References

External links
PSA Netsuite Open 2012 website
Netsuite Open official website

Netsuite Open
Netsuite Open Squash
Netsuite Open Squash
2012 in American sports